This is a list of now defunct airlines from Switzerland.

See also
List of airlines of Switzerland
List of airports in Switzerland

References

Switzerland
Airlines
Airlines, defunct